Maurice Cullen  (June 6, 1866 – March 28, 1934) is considered to be one of the first Impressionist artists in Canada. He is best known for his paintings of snow and for his ice harvest scenes where horse-drawn sleighs travel across the frozen waters of Quebec in the winter.

Life and work 
Cullen was born in St. John's, Newfoundland. In 1870 his family moved to Montreal, Quebec where he began his art training studying sculpture at the Conseil des Arts et Manufactures and with the sculptor Louis-Philippe Hébert at the Monument National. In 1888, he travelled to Paris and took courses at the École des Beaux-Arts with Jean-Léon Gérôme and at the Académie Colarossi with Gustave Courtois and L.A. Rixens. He later studied at the Académie Julian and was admitted to the École des Beaux-Arts in 1890 and studied with Élie Delaunay and Alfred Philippe Roll. Although he received academic training, he was influenced in his painting by the Impressionists, especially Claude Monet and, as early as 1891, critics gave positive reviews to his Impressionist-influenced work. In 1895, the French Government purchased a painting entitled L'été and he was elected an associate of the Société Nationale des Beaux-Arts – the first Canadian to be so honoured but that year, he returned to Montreal and made it his home, turning from French subjects to Canadian ones, with an emphasis on snowscapes and using a modified Impressionist technique. Besides the Quebec landscape, he became the chronicler of the city. In 1910, he married Barbara Merchant Pilot, a widow whose son, his stepson, grew up to be the artist Robert Wakeham Pilot. In the same year, he was invited to be a member of the progressive Canadian Art Club (1910). Cullen set an example for other Canadian painters. A. Y. Jackson said of him,"To us, he was a hero."

Beginning in January 1918, Cullen served with Canadian forces in the First World War. He came to the attention of Lord Beaverbrook, who arranged for him to be commissioned as one of the Canadian official war artists along with Frederick Varley, J.W. Beatty and C. W. Simpson.

Cullen died March 28, 1934, at Chambly, Québec.

Exhibitions 
William Robinson Watson (1887–1973) in Montreal, of Watson Art Gallery, represented Cullen and published a book on him in 1931. An exhibition, Legacies of Impressionism in Canada: Three Exhibitions, was held from January 31 to April 19, 2009 at the Vancouver Art Gallery. In 2019, the National Gallery of Canada travelling show, Canada and Impressionism: New Horizons, opened in Munich. It came to the National Gallery in 2022.

Selected works

Honours 
 First Canadian to be elected associate member of Société nationale des Beaux-Arts, Paris, 1895
 Royal Canadian Academy of Arts, elected full member 1907
 Bronze medal, Canadian exhibition at the Louisiana Purchase Exposition, St. Louis, Missouri, 1904
 Awarded Jessie Dow Prize, Art Association of Montreal, 1911, 1913
 Elected first vice-president of Arts Club, Montreal (founded at his studio), 1912
 He was declared a Canadian Person of National Historic Significance in 1944.

See also 
 Canadian official war artists

Notes

Bibliography 
 
 
 Davis, Ann (1992). The Logic of Ecstasy: Canadian Mystical Painting, 1920–1940. Toronto: University of Toronto Press. ; ;  OCLC 26256269
 Lowrey, Carol, Visions of Light and Air: Canadian Impressionism, 1885–1920, Americas Society, 1996.

1866 births
1934 deaths
Canadian male painters
Artists from Newfoundland and Labrador
People from St. John's, Newfoundland and Labrador
Canadian war artists
Académie Julian alumni
19th-century Canadian painters
20th-century Canadian painters
Canadian landscape painters
Canadian Impressionist painters
19th-century Canadian male artists
20th-century Canadian male artists
Members of the Royal Canadian Academy of Arts